Oboy may refer to:

Oboý, village in Turkmenistan
Oboy (rapper) (born 1997), French-Malagasy rapper

See also
Borgne (Haitian Creole: Obòy), a commune in Haiti
Oh Boy (disambiguation)